The Colorado Springs Millionaires were a minor league baseball team, based in Colorado Springs, Colorado that played primarily in the Western League.

History
The first Colorado Springs team played in the Colorado State League in 1889 and 1896. The Millionaires were formed in 1901 and played through 1905 when they moved to Pueblo, Colorado to become the Pueblo Indians. The Millionaires returned in 1912 in the Rocky Mountain League but they moved at mid-season to Dawson, New Mexico and became the Dawson Stags. The final version of the team played in 1916 in the Western League when the Wichita Witches briefly relocated to Colorado Springs.

External links
Baseball Reference

Defunct Western League teams
Defunct Rocky Mountain League teams
Defunct Colorado State League teams
1889 establishments in Colorado
1916 disestablishments in Colorado
Sports in Colorado Springs, Colorado
Baseball teams established in 1901
Baseball teams disestablished in 1916
Defunct baseball teams in Colorado
Rocky Mountain League teams